Franciscus Hermanus Bach, officially Bachg, (May 28, 1865 – January 22, 1956) was a Dutch painter.

Bach was born in the city of Groningen in the Netherlands as the son of the smith Johann Caspar Bachg, who had migrated to the Netherlands from Haselünne in Germany.
The official spelling of his surname was Bachg but it is reported that Bach himself only realised this late in life.
He usually signed his work as "F.H. Bach" or "F.H.B.".

From pupil to teacher 
At the age of 11 Bach took evening classes at the Academie Minerva, an art school in Groningen.
Two years later he received a bronze medal for drawing.
In 1884 he passed his drawing exam and was awarded the Grote Koninklijke Medaille (great royal medal) for anatomy and the Zilveren Academie Medaille (silver academy medal) for ornamental design.
Johannes Hinderikus Egenberger, the directeur of the Academie Minerva, persuaded the board of the Academie to accept Bach as a master at the age of 19, which he remained for 43 years

In 1918 a number of his old pupils grounded the artist collective De Ploeg.
He had a significant influence on the artistic development of important members of De Ploeg.
Bach was a member of Arti et Amicitiae and, for some years, of De Ploeg.

His work as a painter 
In his work as a landscape and portrait painter, Bach can be considered an impressionist of the Hague School.
He painted nineteen portraits of professors for the senaatskamer (board room) in the Academiegebouw (main building) of the University of Groningen.

Bach also made numerous stations of the cross and murals for Roman Catholic churches in the North, East and South of the Netherlands,
Bach also painted a number of ceramic tableaux, which were erected in the hall of the main railway station in Groningen in 1896.

Bach died at the age of ninety and was buried in the Roman Catholic cemetery in Groningen under a tombstone of his own design.
The artist  wrote of this: "Being the eccentric that he was, he had his own tombstone made while still alive: on this stone he built his spiritual legacy: the formula that he had devised for a new form of the catholic church."

Gallery

References

External links

1865 births
1956 deaths
19th-century Dutch painters
Dutch male painters
20th-century Dutch painters
Painters from Groningen
19th-century Dutch male artists
20th-century Dutch male artists